Christmas Favorites  is the first extended play by Italian operatic pop trio Il Volo.  It’s a Christmas album featuring five tracks. All five tracks were later included on their 2013 studio album, ‘’Buon Natale: The Christmas Album’’. 
The EP was also included in a limited Christmas edition re-release of their debut album, Il Volo released on the same day, restricting sales of this EP.

Track listing

 Note: "Stille Nacht"  is "Silent Night" sung in German.

Charts

Weekly charts
The album has sold 10,000 copies in the US.

Year-end charts

References

2011 EPs
Geffen Records EPs
2011 Christmas albums
Christmas albums by Italian artists
Il Volo albums